Loretta Tofani (February 5, 1953, New York City) is a Pulitzer Prize-winning American journalist.

Life
Tofani earned a bachelor’s degree from Fordham University in 1975 and a master’s degree in journalism from the University of California, Berkeley. She had a Fulbright fellowship to Japan in 1983.

In 1982, while a staff writer at The Washington Post, she wrote a series of articles about a pattern of widespread gang rape inside a Prince George's County Maryland jail for which she won a 1983 Pulitzer Prize for Investigative Reporting. The series was notable for its documentation: Tofani obtained the victims' medical records and interviewed the victims as well as the rapists. The victims were innocent, charged with drunk driving and shop lifting, in jail because they did not have enough money for bond. The jail placed them in the same cellblocks with convicted murderers and armed robbers, who raped them. The jail changed its policies as a result of her story.

After nine years at The Washington Post, Tofani in 1987 became a reporter for The Philadelphia Inquirer, serving as the paper's Beijing Bureau Chief from 1992 through 1996. She wrote for the Inquirer for 14 years. She won other national awards at The Philadelphia Inquirer, and was a finalist for another Pulitzer Prize. She and her family moved to Utah in 2001. She currently lives in Boise, Idaho.

As a free-lancer in 2007, Tofani reported and wrote the newspaper series, "American Imports, Chinese Deaths." The six stories showed that millions of  Chinese factory workers  were getting fatal diseases and limb amputations while making thousands of products for the U.S. Chinese workers have been paying the real price of America's cheap goods.

The series was published in The Salt Lake Tribune (http://extras.sltrib.com/china/).  Tofani reported the series by making five trips to China with small travel grants provided by the Pulitzer Center on Crisis Reporting and the Center for Investigative Reporting's Dick Goldensohn Fund.

Awards 
 Pulitzer Prize, 1983, local investigative reporting.
 Investigative Reporters and Editors award, 1983 and 2008.
 Society of Professional Journalists' award for investigative reporting, 1983 and 2008.
 Michael Kelly Award from the Atlantic Media Company, 2008.
 Special citation from the International Consortium of Investigative Journalists, 2008.
 Daniel Pearl Award for Outstanding International Investigative Reporting, 2008.

References

External links 
Loretta Tofani's blog
 Winner Pulitzer report: "American imports, Chinese deaths: The human cost of doing business" Oct. 2007

American women journalists
Fordham University alumni
Living people
The Philadelphia Inquirer people
Pulitzer Prize for Investigative Reporting winners
1953 births
20th-century American journalists
20th-century American women
21st-century American women